FIFA Player of the Century was a one-off award created by FIFA to decide the greatest football player of the 20th century, announced at the annual FIFA World gala, held in Rome on 11 December 2000. Diego Maradona and Pelé were joint winners of the award.

Background
Since 1955, FIFA has had awards for FIFA World Player of the Year and they decided to bring in the year 2000 by conducting a public vote to decide the FIFA Player of the Century. This was to be decided by votes on their official website, their official magazine, and a grand jury. Maradona won the Internet-based poll by wide margins, garnering 53.6% of the votes against 18.53% for Pelé. Despite the fact that Eusébio, who played football professionally during Pelé's era, placed third in the poll, many observers complained that the Internet nature of the poll would have meant a skewed demographic of younger fans who would have seen Maradona play, but not Pelé. As a result, FIFA decided to add a second poll and appointed a "Football Family" committee composed of football journalists, officials, and coaches, who voted Pelé the best player of the century with 72.75% of the vote, thus both were joint winners of the award.

FIFA Internet vote 
The results of FIFA's internet Poll were as follows:

FIFA Magazine and Grand Jury vote 
This part of the award was decided by the FIFA Magazine readers vote and the FIFA Grand Jury.

References 

Player of the Century
+Player, Men
Pelé
Diego Maradona
2000 sports awards
Association football player non-biographical articles